Malinovo is a village and municipality in western Slovakia in  Senec District in the Bratislava Region.

Names and etymology
The original name comes from a Germanic personal name Eberhardt. The earliest mentions are  Yberhart (1209), Ybrehart (1216), Eburhardi (1260). In 1946, the village was renamed to Malinovo in honor of Soviet Marshal Rodion Malinovsky. Éberhárd is still the official name in the language of the Hungarian minority.

Geography
The municipality lies at an altitude of 128 metres and covers an area of 8.829 km2.

History
In historical records the village was first mentioned in 1209. In the 13th century, the village was inhabited by Germans who lived there until the 16th century. Malinovo was an important port on the Little Danube where also river tolls were charged. In 1548, the village was already completely abandoned and re-settled again. In 1773, it was already mostly Hungarian.

The old village castle was acquired in June 1763 by Count György Apponyi of the Apponyi family. It was rebuilt into its current form by the Apponyis in the early 19th century. Statesman György Apponyi died in the castle in 1899, and his son Albert Apponyi often received guests there. In 1923 it became the home of the State Agricultural School of Czechoslovakia. It is still home to a Horticultural School named after Gustav Čejka (cs).

After World War I, it became a part of Czechoslovakia. Between 1938 and 1945, through the First Vienna Award, Malinovo became a part of Miklós Horthy's Hungary . After World War II, the Hungarian population was partially expelled and replaced by Slovaks from Hungary.

Point of Interest

The Apponyi castle is still standing in a public park, but (as of late 2019) in need of renovation.

Demographics
According to the 2011 census, the municipality had 1,861 inhabitants. 1,158 of inhabitants were Slovaks, 625 Hungarians, 13 Czechs and 65 others and unspecified.

References

External links

  Official page
https://web.archive.org/web/20071217080336/http://www.statistics.sk/mosmis/eng/run.html

Villages and municipalities in Senec District